American Tour is the third U.S. studio album by the English rock band The Dave Clark Five. This album contains the hit song "Because" as well as "Whenever You're Around", which was not a single in the U.S. but was issued as a B-side to "I'm Thinking of You Baby" in the U.K., and was used in the film Get Yourself a College Girl. In Canada, the album was released as On Stage With The Dave Clark Five on Capitol Records.

The album reached No. 11 on the Billboard 200 album chart and No. 16 in Cashbox.

Contrary to its title (decorated with stars and stripes on the cover art), photos of huge crowds, and sleeve note (by John Mahan, Epic’s manager of East Coast promotion) - all inspired by the band's first US tour - "American Tour" is a studio record (The Dave Clark Five have never released a live album). And although tour photos on the cover look very energetic, the album is dominated by catchy rhythmic ballads with only three upbeat songs: "Who Does He Think He Is", "I Want You Still" and "Come On Over".

The album has not been released in the UK.  

In his AllMusic retrospective review of the release, Greg Adams wrote, "The mixture of jazzy chords, straight-ahead rock, and saxophone (which was pretty passé in 1964) is an interesting one, making the group less enigmatic than the Zombies and more obviously rooted in earlier rock traditions than the Beatles."

Track listing

Side one
"Because" (Ron Ryan) – 2:22
"Who Does He Think He Is" (Dave Clark, Mike Smith) – 1:55
"Move On" (Dave Clark, Denny Payton) – 2:12
"Whenever You're Around" (Dave Clark, Mike Smith) – 2:43
"I Want You Still" (Dave Clark, Denny Payton) – 1:34
"Long Ago" (Dave Clark, Lenny Davidson) – 2:11

Side two
"Come on Over" (Dave Clark, Lenny Davidson) – 2:18
"Blue Monday" (Dave Clark, Mike Smith) – 2:59
"Sometimes" (Ron Ryan) – 2:50
"Any Time You Want Love" (Dave Clark, Lenny Davidson) – 2:11
"I Cried Over You" (Dave Clark, Lenny Davidson) – 2:27
"Ol' Sol" (Dave Clark, Denny Payton) – 2:00

Personnel

Dave Clark Five
Dave Clark - drums, backing vocals
Mike Smith - keyboards, lead vocals
Lenny Davidson - guitars, backing vocals and harmony vocals
Rick Huxley - bass guitar, backing vocals
Denis Payton - saxophone,  backing vocals

References

External links
http://www.discogs.com/Dave-Clark-Five-American-Tour/release/2905884

The Dave Clark Five albums
1964 debut albums
EMI Columbia Records albums